Chiles may refer to:

 Chiles (surname)
 Chiles (volcano), an extinct volcano in Ecuador
 Chiles, Nariño, a settlement in Nariño Department, Colombia.
 Chiles Center, a multi-purpose arena in Portland, Oregon
 Lillis Business Complex, a building on the University of Oregon campus
 New Mexico Chiles, an American soccer club

See also
 Childs (disambiguation)
 Chile (disambiguation)
 Chiles Valley AVA, California wine region in Napa Valley
 Chili pepper